The first Battle of Heligoland took place on 4 June 1849 during the First Schleswig War and pitted the fledgling Reichsflotte (Imperial Fleet) against the Royal Danish Navy, which had blocked German naval trade in North Sea and Baltic Sea since early 1848. The outcome was inconclusive, with no casualties, and the blockade went on. It remained the only battle of the German fleet.

Battle

At the outbreak of the First Schleswig War, the Danes instituted a blockade, stopping  all German trade in the North Sea and the Baltic Sea. This prompted the German parliament at Frankfurt to form a new all-German navy.
The Germans had to build a fleet from scratch, buying ships abroad and converting them, and hiring foreign officers (British, Belgian) to lead native veteran merchant mariners.

After about a year of preparation, on 4 June, German Admiral Karl Rudolf Brommy left Bremerhaven with the steam frigate SMS Barbarossa (formerly RMS Britannia) and the smaller steam corvettes Lübeck (1844) and Hamburg (1841) in order to disperse the Danish ships which were guarding the mouth of Weser River. The Danish forces present that day were inferior and retreated, but Brommy managed to cut off the sailing corvette Valkyrien which under captain Andreas Polder sought refuge near the island of Heligoland which at the time belonged to the United Kingdom. The British, while being neutral, had made clear beforehand that a German Navy was not welcome and might be treated as pirates.

Ships of both sides fired some shots, with no effect. When the German approached the island's three-mile zone, the British forces fired warning shots towards them, while allowing the Danish corvette to stay close. Brommy, not willing to draw the Royal Navy into the war, stayed at a distance while the Danish captain Polder was waiting for the arrival of reinforcements from the Danish main fleet. When the modern steamer Gejser, under Kaptajnløjtnant (captain lieutenant) Jørgen Peter Frederik Wulff, came into sight, Brommy retreated, fearing further Danish reinforcements. The Danes followed the Germans to the mouth of the Elbe near Cuxhaven before resuming the blockade.

It was the first and the last excursion of the small fleet under the black-red-gold Flag of Germany.

See also 
Battle of Heligoland (1864)

Notes

Literature 
 Guntram Schulze-Wegener: Deutschland zur See . 150 Jahre Marinegeschichte. Mittler, Hamburg 1998.  
 Jörg Duppler : Germania auf dem Meere / Bilder und Dokumente zur Deutschen Marinegeschichte 1848 –1998. Mittler, Hamburg 1998. 
 Giese, Fritz: Kleine Geschichte der deutschen Flotte
 Hansen, Hans Jürgen: Die Schiffe der deutschen Flotten 1848–1945
 Hildebrand, Hans H. / Henriot, Ernest:: Deutschlands Admirale 1849–1945
 Kroschel, Günter / Evers, August-Ludwig: Die deutsche Flotte 1848–1945
 Rhades, Dr. Jürgen: Die deutsche Marine in Vergangenheit und Gegenwart
 Röhr, Albert: Deutsche Marinechronik
 Witthöft, Hans Jürgen: Lexikon zur deutschen Marinegeschichte
 Georg Wislicenus: Deutschlands Seemacht, Published 2007 Reprint-Verlag-Leipzig, 206 pages,  
 Lawrence Sondhaus: Naval Warfare, 1815–1914, Published 2001, Routledge, 272 pages,

External links 
 Deutsche Marine, History 

 Überblick über die Reichsflotte 

1849 in Denmark
1849 in Germany
Conflicts in 1849
Battle 1849
Battles and conflicts without fatalities
Naval battles involving Germany
Naval battles of the First Schleswig War
June 1849 events